Ahmed Reda Madouni (born 4 October 1980) is an Algerian former professional footballer who played as a defender.

Club career
Madouni played for Montpellier and Borussia Dortmund before joining Bayer Leverkusen. In 2007, he transferred to Qatar to play for Al-Gharafa. In July 2009, Madouni signed for French Ligue 2 club Clermont. On 19 May 2010, he joined 1. FC Union Berlin on a three-year contract.

Madouni moved to Nantes in 2012.

Madouni signed a contract with Energie Cottbus on 17 January 2014 for six months with an option to extend for another year. He left Cottbus at the end of the season after they were relegated from the 2. Bundesliga.

International career
A former French youth international formed in Montpellier, Madouni made the switch to join the Algeria national team in June 2005, as he played his first game for the Fennecs, a friendly against Mali. He holds two international caps.

Honours
Montpellier
 UEFA Intertoto Cup: 1999

Borussia Dortmund
 Bundesliga: 2001–02

Al-Gharafa
 Qatar Stars League: 2007–08

References

External links
 

1980 births
Living people
Moroccan people of Algerian descent
Footballers from Casablanca
Algerian footballers
Moroccan footballers
Association football defenders
Algeria international footballers
Borussia Dortmund players
Bayer 04 Leverkusen players
Clermont Foot players
Montpellier HSC players
1. FC Union Berlin players
FC Nantes players
FC Energie Cottbus players
Al-Gharafa SC players
Bundesliga players
2. Bundesliga players
Ligue 1 players
Ligue 2 players
Qatar Stars League players
Algerian expatriate footballers
Algerian expatriate sportspeople in Germany
Expatriate footballers in Germany
Algerian expatriate sportspeople in France
Expatriate footballers in France
Algerian expatriate sportspeople in Qatar
Expatriate footballers in Qatar